Ken Obst was an Australian rules footballer for the Port Adelaide Football Club during the 1930s and 1940s.

References

Port Adelaide Football Club players (all competitions)